Davino may refer to:

Surname 
Duilio Davino (born 1976), Mexican footballer
Eduardo Davino (1929–2011), Italian Roman Catholic bishop
Flavio Davino (born 1974), Mexican footballer
Roberval Davino (born 1954), Brazilian footballer

Given name 
Davino Verhulst (born 1987), Belgian football (soccer) goalkeeper